Harlow House may refer to:

Historic buildings
Harlow Old Fort House, Plymouth, Massachusetts
Sgt. William Harlow Family Homestead, Plymouth, Massachusetts
Elmer Harlow House, Eugene, Oregon
Fred Harlow House, Troutdale, Oregon

Other
House of Harlow, a jewelry line